Marion Caspers-Merk (born 24 April 1955 in Mannheim) is a German politician and member of the Social Democratic Party of Germany (SPD). She was a member of the Bundestag, representing Lörrach – Müllheim, and Parliamentary State Secretary at the Federal Ministry of Health. Alongside other prominent figures such as Kofi Annan and Javier Solana, Caspers-Merk served on the Global Commission on Drug Policy which advocates reforms in drug policies towards the regulation of all substances.

References

External links 
  
 Biography from German Bundestag 
 Caspers-Merk on Drug Policy 

1955 births
Living people
Politicians from Mannheim
Free University of Berlin alumni
University of Freiburg alumni
Members of the Bundestag for Baden-Württemberg
Female members of the Bundestag
21st-century German women politicians
Members of the Bundestag 2005–2009
Members of the Bundestag 2002–2005
Members of the Bundestag 1998–2002
Members of the Bundestag 1994–1998
Members of the Bundestag for the Social Democratic Party of Germany
20th-century German women politicians
Drug policy reform activists